Kakhaber Gogichaishvili (Georgian: კახაბერ 'კახი' გოგიჩაიშვილი; born 31 October 1968) is a retired football defender who was capped 27 times for Georgia between 1992 and 2000. He scored 1 goal, a penalty kick in Georgia's 6–3 win over Azerbaijan in 1992 (Azerbaijan's first international match). On club level Gogichaishvili played for Tbilisi clubs Shevardeni-1906, Dinamo, Lokomotivi and Merani-Olimpi Tbilisi.

International goals

Coaching career
After retiring Gogichaishvili began coaching. During 2013–14 season, he was the head coach of Dinamo Tbilisi's reserve team. In 2014, together with him, Dinamo's youth team won prestigious youth tournament Ruhr Cup, defeated Galatasaray in the final, after eliminating Borussia Mönchengladbach in the semi-final. Shortly after this success, Gogichaishvili replaced Michal Bilek and became Dinamo's first team head coach.

In 2019, Gogichaishvili was appointed as manager of FC Zugdidi. After three years spent there in early 2022 he took charge of Gareji.

References

External links

Soviet footballers
Footballers from Georgia (country)
Expatriate footballers from Georgia (country)
Georgia (country) international footballers
FC Dinamo Tbilisi players
FC Guria Lanchkhuti players
Hapoel Ashkelon F.C. players
Expatriate footballers in Israel
Expatriate footballers in Russia
FC Lokomotiv Nizhny Novgorod players
1968 births
Living people
Association football midfielders